The Last Kingdom: Seven Kings Must Die is an upcoming British historical drama film directed by Edward Bazalgette, written by Martha Hillier, and based on the The Saxon Stories by Bernard Cornwell. It is a sequel to the The Last Kingdom television series. Alexander Dreymon reprised his role as Uhtred of Bebbanburg. The film is entirely unrelated to the Seven Kings district in the London Borough of Redbridge.

It is scheduled to be released by Netflix on 14 April 2023. It is intended to act as the conclusion to the series and the story.

Premise
Following the death of King Edward, invaders and rival heirs battle for the crown and Uthred must adventure once again with his comrades as they attempt to form a united England.

Cast
 Alexander Dreymon as Uhtred of Bebbanburg
 Mark Rowley as Finan
 Arnas Fedaravicius as Sihtric
 Rod Hallet as Constantin
 Harry Gilby as Æthelstan
 Ross Anderson as Domnal
 Ingrid García-Jonsson
 James Northcote as Aldhelm
 Cavan Clerkin as Father Pyrlig
 Tom Christian as Dunstan 
 Ewan Horrocks as Ælfweard of Wessex
 Zak Sutcliffe as Edmund 
 Nick Wittman as Eamon
 Alexandra Tóth as Lady-in-waiting

Production
Producer Nigel Marchant revealed that talks about a movie had been proceeding following the launch of The Last Kingdom's fourth season in April 2020. In October 2021, prior to the fifth season of The Last Kingdom being released on Netflix in early 2022, the feature length sequel to the series was announced at the London MCM Comic-Con by Dreymon, who acted as executive producer as well as starring as Uhtred on the show. It was given the working title Seven Kings Must Die and would follow events of the series which took place over a circa-45 year period of history from 866 onwards focusing on the Kingdom of Wessex and ongoing Viking incursions into England. 

The screenplay for Seven Kings Must Die was written by Martha Hillier with direction by Ed Bazalgette and production by Marchant, Gareth Neame and Mat Chaplin. Alongside  Dreymon, Hillier also served as executive producer. It was produced by Carnival Films and distributed worldwide by NBCUniversal International Distribution. Principal photography began in Budapest in early 2022, and wrapped by the end of March 2022.

Release
The film is scheduled to be released on 14 April 2023, by Netflix.

References

External links

Upcoming films
2023 films
English-language Netflix original programming
Films based on British novels
Films set in the Middle Ages
Films shot in Hungary
Films set in Europe
Films set in the Viking Age